The 2017–18 Boston University Terriers women's basketball team represents Boston University during the 2017–18 NCAA Division I women's basketball season. The Terries, led by fourth year head coach Katy Steding, play their home games at Case Gym and were members of the Patriot League. They finished the season 10–19, 5–13 in Patriot League play to finish in ninth place. They lost in the first round of the Patriot League women's tournament to Lafayette.

On March 13, head coach Katy Steding was fired. She finished at Boston University with four year record of 31–88.

Previous season
They finished the season 13–17, 11–7 in Patriot League play to finish in a tie for fourth place. They lost in the quarterfinals of the Patriot League women's tournament to American.

Roster

Schedule

|-
!colspan=9 style=| Non-conference regular season

|-
!colspan=9 style=| Patriot League regular season

|-
!colspan=9 style=| Patriot League Women's Tournament

See also
 2017–18 Boston University Terriers men's basketball team

References

Boston University
Boston University Terriers women's basketball seasons